New College Lanarkshire is a further education institution in Scotland in North Lanarkshire. The college was created in November 2013 from the merger of Cumbernauld College and Motherwell College, and in 2014 it absorbed Coatbridge College. It has over 25,000 students.

Cumbernauld campus 
The main campus building was completed in 1978 as Cumbernauld Technical College, to designs by the Glasgow architectural practice Gillespie, Kidd & Coia. The original building is category B listed.

In August 2006, Cumbernauld College completed an extensive phased refurbishment and new build programme at the main campus. A window replacement scheme, renewal of lighting and heating systems, and internal space reconfiguration complement a new , three-story teaching block. Ground and first floor levels provide additional fully equipped teaching facilities and specialist rooms for health care, travel and tourism, and art. On the third floor the Business and Conference Centre offers the wider Business Community training and conference facilities. A new front entrance, reception and internal ‘street’ connects all buildings and provides improved access to student services and support, learning centres, library facilities and social areas, as well as a dynamic space for exhibitions, promotion and student activity.

On Friday 1 November, Cumbernauld College and Motherwell college merged to rename as New College Lanarkshire

Campuses 
Broadwood Campus
Coatbridge Campus
Cumbernauld Campus
Kirkintilloch Campus
Motherwell Campus
Hamilton Campus

Training Unit

The Training Unit delivers a range of government-funded programmes to enable individuals to enter into sustainable employment.  These include:
Training for Work
Get Ready for Work
Employability Courses
Skillseekers / Modern Apprentices
Support Employment

Business and Conference Centre

Funded as part of the redevelopment programme, the Business and Conference Centre provides skills gap analysis, training needs analysis and bespoke training programmes for commercial clients. It includes meeting and conferencing facilities for 2 to 90.

Students Association
New College Lanarkshire's Cumbernauld Campus Students Association now has a Sabbatical Student President and a full team of student officers.

References

External links

Further education colleges in Scotland
Educational institutions established in 2013
Education in North Lanarkshire
2013 establishments in Scotland
Cumbernauld
Coatbridge
Buildings and structures in Motherwell
Buildings and structures in North Lanarkshire